The Jorge B. Vargas Museum & Filipiniana Research Center, simply known as the UP Vargas Museum, is a museum located at the University of the Philippines (UP) Diliman campus which houses the collection of art, stamps and coins, library, personal papers and memorabilia of Jorge B. Vargas which he bequeathed to the university. It is under the management of the UP Diliman College of Arts and Letters.

History
The construction of the building which would host the UP Vargas Museum began in 1983. The museum building was inaugurated on February 22, 1987, by then-President Corazon Aquino.

Collection
The Museum is known for its collection of the paintings of Juan Luna, Felix Resurreccion Hidalgo, Victorio Edades and Fernando Amorsolo.

See also
Filipiniana

Literature

References

External links 

University of the Philippines
Museums in Quezon City
Libraries in Metro Manila
Art museums and galleries in the Philippines
Educational structures in Metro Manila
University museums in the Philippines
Tourist attractions in Quezon City